The DTA Diva is a French double-surface ultralight trike wing, designed and produced by DTA sarl of Montélimar and introduced in 2009. The wing is widely used on DTA trikes as well as by other ultralight aircraft manufacturers.

Design and development
The Diva is a cable-braced, king post-equipped hang glider-style wing designed as a touring wing for two-place trikes. The wing is comparatively small in area, which gives a higher cruise speed at the cost of a higher stall speed.

The wing is made from bolted-together aluminum tubing, with its 84% double surface wing covered in Dacron sailcloth. The wing's crosstube is of a floating design. Its  span wing has a nose angle of 130°, an aspect ratio of 5.2:1  and uses an "A" frame weight-shift control bar. The wing tips feature small winglets. It is manufactured by DTA's subcontractor, La société Ellipse.

Applications
DTA Combo
DTA Evolution
DTA Feeling
DTA Voyageur

Specifications (Diva 12)

References

External links

Ultralight trike wings